"I Just Don't Give a Damn" is a song co-written by  American country singer George Jones.   It was released as the B-side to his 1975 single "Memories of Us."

Background
Following his divorce from singer Tammy Wynette in 1975, Jones had already begun his long, slow descent to the bottom.  Already drinking constantly, he would soon begin using cocaine and often disappear for weeks on end, missing shows and other appearances.  Making matters worse, his seeming invincibility on the country singles chart began to wane; although his duets with Wynette remained popular (the duet "Golden Ring" shot to #1 in 1976), his own releases languished.  "Memories of Us," the title track of his first LP released after his divorce, limped to #21 on the singles chart.  However, with the benefit of hindsight, the most extraordinary aspect about the single is the stunning B-side "I Just Don't Give a Damn."

Composition and reception
Jones, who wrote many of his own hits in the first decade of his career, had become every country songwriter's dream client in the years since.  Consequently,  he had little need to compose as many songs as he used to since he was often given first crack at the best new songs Nashville had to offer.  That fact, combined with the turmoil that surrounded him at the time, makes "I Just Don't Give a Damn" - an extremely acerbic song - all the more fascinating.  Thom Jurek of AllMusic calls the song "the bitterest cut Jones ever recorded. He claims he wrote it at 3 a.m. in the aftermath of the divorce, and it comes right from the Hank Williams tradition of catharsis songs. Jones condemns everyone and everything including himself. As he denies his shortcomings, he fires back simultaneously - with razor-sharp fineness - his anger. That fiddle floating in the background offers a portrait of loneliness and rage that is unbridled and self-destructive in the classic honky tonk style."  As if making his own state-of-the-union address before diving headlong into the gutter, Jones leaves no doubt as to his state of mind:

There are those who'd like to change the way I'm living
It seems they just don't like me the way I am
Tomorrow I may live the way they're thinking
Oh, but tonight I just don't give a damn

On the bridge, Jones addresses the object of his scorn (presumably Wynette) directly, but also fully aware of the pain and torment he is about to inflict on himself:

Tonight I just don't care what happens to you or me
I wanted to get you on my side but you've always disagreed
If you should ever want to call me I'll be on my side of town
But don't call tonight 'cause I still don't give a damn

Oh, tomorrow morning I may wake up lonely
Oh, but tonight I just don't give a damn

In the liner notes to the 1999 reissue of Memories of Us, Daniel Cooper writes that "I Just Don't Give a Damn" "hearkens back to the sort of material Jones's idol Hank Williams used to write when Hank was feeling his most embittered. In his prolific career, Jones has made dozens of bone-chilling recordings that languish as forgotten, seemingly throwaway album tracks and B-sides...Yet all these years later 'I Just Don't Give a Damn' rings harrowingly true and honest, like a sketched, 3 a.m. self-portrait by one of America's greatest artists." In his 1995 autobiography I Lived to Tell It All, the singer recalled, "'I Just Don't Give a Damn' was my 86th single record. It was on the Billboard survey for only two weeks and peaked at number 92 on the top 100. I had never released a record on a major label that did so poorly." Although it was ignored at the time of release, it has since become viewed as a tour de force by Jones, and was included on the 2006 Legacy retrospective The Essential George Jones.

A rare, grainy clip of Jones performing the song at his Possum Holler club in Nashville is available on YouTube.

Chart performance

References

1975 songs
George Jones songs
Song recordings produced by Billy Sherrill
Epic Records singles
Songs written by George Jones